Matthew John Heath is a United States citizen who was arrested by the government of Venezuela in September 2020 and subsequently charged with offenses related to terrorism and arms trafficking. Heath is a former member of the U.S. Marine Corps where he specialized in signals intelligence and had previously worked for MVM, Inc., a Virginia-based private security contractor.

Detention 
Heath had set sail in the Caribbean on a trawler called the "Purple Dream" in March 2020, and had sailed to Nicaragua and Colombia. He was arrested along with five others in Colombia after being found with a handgun at a checkpoint. After being released from jail in Colombia he traveled to Venezuela ostensibly in an attempt to return home to the United States but was arrested again. Venezuelan authorities claim to have arrested Heath as he was in possession of an AT4 rocket launcher, an Uzi sub-machine gun, C-4 explosives, pictures of a nearby oil refinery, and foreign currency. His lawyer has called the charges against him falsified. Additionally, Heath was imprisoned in El Helicoide prison and his family accused the Venezuelan government of torturing him.

Venezuelan Attorney General Tarek Saab labeled Heath a "mercenary" and accused him of attempting to destabilize the country. In February 2021, Venezuelan judicial authorities ordered that a trial begin for Heath. The U.S. State Department called upon the Venezuelan government to provide a fair hearing for Heath.

Release 
Heath's family was family is a part of the Bring Our Families Home campaign which advocates to bring home wrongful detainees and hostages. Heath's image is featured in a 15-foot mural in Georgetown (Washington, D.C.) along with other Americans wrongfully detained abroad.

On 1 October 2022, Heath was released as part of a prisoner swap between the United States and Venezuela. The swap saw Heath and six other Americans exchanged for two nephews of Venezuelan President Nicolas Maduro's wife.

See also 

 Narcosobrinos affair

References

American mercenaries
People from Maynardville, Tennessee
Year of birth missing (living people)
Living people
 United States Marines
 prisoners and detainees of Venezuela
 American people imprisoned abroad